Albertine Rahéliarisoa (born 15 June 1961) is a Malagasy middle-distance runner. She competed in the women's 800 metres at the 1980 Summer Olympics.

References

1961 births
Living people
Athletes (track and field) at the 1980 Summer Olympics
Malagasy female middle-distance runners
Olympic athletes of Madagascar
Place of birth missing (living people)